Philippines–Singapore relations are bilateral relations between the Philippines and Singapore. The Philippines has an embassy in Singapore. Singapore likewise, has an embassy in Manila. Full diplomatic relations commenced on May 16, 1969, when the Philippine consulate-general in Singapore was raised to embassy level.

Both countries are members of APEC, and founding members of ASEAN.

Relations

The Philippine-Singapore Business Council is also present as an organization dedicated to the cooperation of the business communities of the two countries. The council was launched on 13 October 1994 in Singapore. Both  Fidel V. Ramos, the President of the Philippines, and Goh Chok Tong, the Prime Minister of Singapore attended the launch.

Aside from economic relationships, the two countries also agree in improving tourism and security relationships. In August 1986, Philippine President Corazon Aquino preferred to travel to Jakarta and Singapore, breaking the tradition that the first overseas visit of the President should always be Washington. Singapore Prime Minister Lee Kuan Yew, together with Indonesian President Suharto, suggested to Aquino to avoid reconciliation with the communist insurgents in her country and extend the rights of the bases of the United States in the Philippines. During a state visit by Philippine President Gloria Macapagal Arroyo in Singapore on 2007, she discussed the liberalization of air travel between the two countries to improve tourism. She also discussed with Singapore Prime Minister Lee Hsien Loong regarding a status of forces agreement (SOFA) to combat terrorism and transnational crimes.

In 1995, a planned state visit by the Singaporean Prime Minister was postponed "until a more propitious time" after the execution of Flor Contemplacion. The case caused the deepest rift between the two ASEAN countries for more than 25 years. Economic relationships between the two countries were also strained. Singaporean investments in the Philippines dropped from US$65 million from 1994 to US$3.7 million by 1995. Despite this controversy, full diplomatic relationships between the two countries were restored in January of the following year. In December 1998, the two countries signed a Philippine-Singapore Action to improve bilateral trade at the ASEAN summit in Hanoi.

In 2013, Singapore is Philippines' 4th top trading partner, with $8.22 billion in bilateral trade. It was also the sixth top source of visitors, with more than 175,000 in arrivals. Singapore is also host to a Filipino community of some 180,000.

Military
In January 2017, Secretary Delfin Lorenzana has announced that he is seeking a revival of Filipino-Singaporean military exercises known as Anoa-Singa, which started in 1994. It was stopped in 1996 due to a lack of a military agreement that would allow Singaporean forces to conduct exercises since the Filipino Constitution does not allow foreign troops to be deployed in the Philippines.

Agreements
In 2007, the two countries signed a Memorandum of Understanding in order to promote cooperation in media policy and information exchange. In 2008, the Philippine government voluntarily stopped the export of 50,000 tonnes of pork to Singapore due to the cases of Ebola Reston in some farms in Luzon. This was supposed to be the Philippines first ever export of pork.

References

 
Singapore
Bilateral relations of Singapore